Yema may refer to:

Arts
 Yema EP, a 2012 album by Canadian performer Damn Kids
 Yema (1987), an album by Assyrian-American musician Janan Sawa
 Yema (2013), an Algerian film by Djamila Sahraoui

Companies
 Yema (watch), a French watchmaking company
 Yema Auto, a Chinese automobile manufacturer

Food
 Yema (candy), a sweet custard confectionery from the Philippines
 Yemas de Santa Teresa, a pastry originating from the province of Ávila, Spain

Places
 Laguna Yema, Formosa, a settlement in northern Argentina
 Yema Township, a town in Taonan district, Jilin province, China

Incidents
 Yema stabbings, a 2016 mass murder in the village of Yema, Yunnan Province, China